Lernaeocera is a genus of marine copepods in the family Pennellidae.

Species
The genus contains the following species:

Lernaeocera abyssicola (Brady, 1883)
Lernaeocera branchialis (Linnaeus, 1767)
Lernaeocera caparti Machado-Cruz, 1959
Lernaeocera esocina (Hermann, 1783)
Lernaeocera galei Krøyer, 1837
Lernaeocera lusci (Bassett-Smith, 1896)
Lernaeocera minuta (T. Scott, 1900)
Lernaeocera sauciatonis (Leigh-Sharpe, 1935)

References

Siphonostomatoida
Copepod genera
Taxa named by Henri Marie Ducrotay de Blainville